Patrick Larkin (26 July 1905 – 19 September 1976) was an Irish hurler who played as a full-back for the Kilkenny senior team.

Born in Patrick St., Kilkenny, Larkin first played competitive hurling during his school days at St. Patrick's De La Salle. He arrived on the inter-county scene at the age of twenty when he first linked up with the Kilkenny senior team in various tournament games, before later lining out with the junior side. He made his competitive senior debut in the 1929–30 National Hurling League. Larkin went on to play a key part for Kilkenny during a hugely successful era, and won four All-Ireland medals, nine Leinster medals and one National Hurling League medal. He was an All-Ireland runner-up on four occasions.

As a representative on the Leinster inter-provincial team for much of his inter-county career, Larkin won three Railway Cup medals in 1932, 1933 and 1936. At club level he won five championship medals with James Stephens, Tullaroan and Éire Óg.

With 43 championship appearances for Kilkenny, Larkin was the most "capped" full-back in the county's history. This record was later surpassed by Noel Hickey. He retired from inter-county hurling following Kilkenny's shock exit at the hands of Antrim in the 1943 championship.

The Larkin family hold a unique distinction in hurling history as the only family to experience All-Ireland success through three generations. Larkin's son, Fan, who five All-Ireland medals between 1963 and 1979, while his grandson, Philly, won two All-Ireland medals in 2000 and 2002. Larkin's brother, Mick, was an All-Ireland medallist as a non-playing substitute in 1935.

Biography

Paddy Larkin was born and raised in locally named 'village' area of Kilkenny.  He was educated locally and, in time, he would go on to become one of Kilkenny's great players during the 1930s.

Playing career

Club

Larkin played his club hurling with the famous James Stephens club in Kilkenny and enjoyed much success.  He won his first senior county title in 1935.  Two years later Larkin was captain of the club as he captured a second county title with 'the village.’

Inter-county

Larkin first came to prominence on the inter-county scene for Kilkenny in the early 1930s.  He won his first Leinster title in 1931 following a victory over Laois in the provincial final.  Larkin later lined out in his first All-Ireland final with Cork providing the opposition.  The low-scoring game ended in a draw – 1–6 apiece.  Four weeks later the two times met again for the replay.  In a similar pattern Cork took the lead at half-time, however, Kilkenny fought back to equalise.  At the final whistle both sides finished with 2–5.  The third game of the series took place in the first week of November, however, on this occasion there would be a winner as Cork sealed the victory by 5–8 to 3–4.

In 1932 Larkin captured a second Leinster title as Dublin were defeated in the provincial final.  The subsequent All-Ireland final saw Kilkenny take on Clare. It was the first ever meeting of these two teams in the history of the championship. In a close and exciting match Kilkenny took the lead thanks to goals by Matty Power, Lory Meagher and Martin White. Clare fought back, however, Kilkenny hung on to win the game by 3–3 to 2–3 giving Larkin his first All-Ireland medal.

Larkin won a National Hurling League medal at the start of 1933 before helping Kilkenny to retain their provincial dominance in with a defeat of Dublin, giving Larkin a third Leinster medal. A defeat of Galway in the next game set up an All-Ireland final meeting with Limerick. In another tight game Kilkenny sealed the victory with a 1–7 to 0–6 score line giving Larkin his second consecutive All-Ireland title. Kilkenny lost their provincial title in 1934, however, Power won a fourth Leinster medal in 1935. The All-Ireland final saw Kilkenny take on Limerick for the second time in three years. Once again the match was a close one, however, Kilkenny clung on and won by a single point – 2–5 to 2–4. It was Larkin's third victory in an All-Ireland final.

In 1936 Larkin was appointed captain of the Kilkenny team.  That year he guided his team to another Leinster final victory over Laois, his fifth winners' medal in all, before lining out in yet another All-Ireland final. Once again, the two outstanding teams of the decade, Kilkenny and Limerick, were paired together in the championship decider. Limerick were coming into their prime at this stage and gained revenge for the defeats of 1933 and 1935 by trouncing 'the Cats' on a score line of 5–6 to 1–5.

Kilkenny bounced back in 1937 with Larkin adding a sixth Leinster title to his collection.  The All-Ireland final pitted Kilkenny against Tipperary in the unusual venue of FitzGerald Stadium in Killarney. 'The Cats' were definitely on a downward spiral by this stage as they were walloped by 3–11 to 0–3.

Larkin was appointed captain of Kilkenny for the second time in 1938, however, Dublin accounted for his team in the Leinster final.  In 1939 'the Cats' reclaimed their provincial crown with a victory over All-Ireland champions Dublin.  It was Larkin's seventh provincial medal of the decade.  The subsequent All-Ireland final against Cork has gone down in history as the famous 'thunder and lightning' final when a huge downpour interrupted play. In the end victory went to Kilkenny by a single point.  It was not the last time that 'the Cats' would defeat 'the Rebels' by a single point in a final.  It was Larkin's fourth All-Ireland medal.

In 1940 Larkin added an eighth Leinster medal to his collection after another defeat of Dublin.  The All-Ireland final saw Kilkenny and Limerick, the two dominant teams of the last decade, take to the field for one final game.  Kilkenny had peaked in the final the year before while Limerick were now reaching their prime.  A 3–7 to 1–7 defeat for Kilkenny resulted in Larkin ending up on the losing side for the fourth time.

An outbreak of foot-and-mouth disease in the county hampered Kilkenny's championship hopes for the next few seasons.  In spite of this the team bounced back in 1943 with Larkin adding a ninth Leinster medal to his already impressive collection.  The subsequent All-Ireland semi-final provided what was regarded as the time as the biggest shock in the history of the championship. Antrim had defeated Galway in the All-Ireland quarter-final in, what was described as, a fluke.  Antrim proved that their victory was far from lucky as they defeated Larkin's side in the subsequent semi-final.  This marked one of Larkin's last appearances for Kilkenny as he retired from inter-county hurling shortly after.

Provincial

Larkin also lined out with Leinster in the early years of the inter-provincial hurling championship.  He first lined out for his province in 1932 and captured his first Railway Cup medal following a victory over Munster. Larkin won a second Railway Cup title in 1933; however, Munster reclaimed the title in 1934 and 1935.  In 1936 Larkin was captain of Leinster as he collected his third Railway Cup memento. It was his last medal with his province; however, he continued playing until 1939.

Teams

External links
 James Stephens GAA club website

1905 births
1976 deaths
James Stephens hurlers
Tullaroan hurlers
Éire Óg (Kilkenny) hurlers
Kilkenny inter-county hurlers
Leinster inter-provincial hurlers
All-Ireland Senior Hurling Championship winners